Lewis & Clark is an American sitcom television series that aired on NBC for one season from October 29, 1981 to July 30, 1982. The series stars Gabe Kaplan (who also created the series) and Guich Koock.

Plot
For a native New Yorker, Stewart Lewis (Gabe Kaplan) has a strange—some would say twisted—ambition: he wants to own a country-music club. His wife and kids hate the idea. Despite their misgivings, Stewart moves his family to Luckenbach, Texas, where he bought the Nassau County Cafe, a joint that has had nine owners in the last six years and sports a sign that says "Always Under New Management". While his sidekick Roscoe Clark (Guich Koock) stands by, Stewart lets fly one-liners and bad puns.

The series featured an episode with guest appearances by Robert Hegyes and Lawrence Hilton-Jacobs, who were two of Kaplan's co-stars on Welcome Back, Kotter. At one point during the episode, Hegyes' character tells Lewis, "You should have been a teacher."

Cast
 Gabe Kaplan as Stewart Lewis 
 Guich Koock as Roscoe Clark 
 Ilene Graff as Alicia Lewis 
 David Hollander as Keith Lewis 
 Wendy Holcombe as Wendy 
 Clifton James as Silas Jones
 Amy Linker as Kelly Lewis
 Michael McManus as John

Reception
The series was intended to be a comeback vehicle for Kaplan after the cancellation of the popular series Welcome Back, Kotter. Ratings for the series, however, were low and NBC canceled the series in January 1982 after eight episodes. The remaining five episodes were burned off in July 1982.

Broadcast history
The first four episodes aired Thursdays at 8:30-9:00 on NBC. The next four episodes aired Saturdays at 9:30-10:00. The last five episodes aired Fridays at 8:00-8:30.

Episodes

* Unknown

Production notes
The series was created by series star Gabe Kaplan, and produced by Johnny Carson's  Carson Productions.

References

External links
 
 

1981 American television series debuts
1982 American television series endings
1980s American sitcoms
English-language television shows
NBC original programming
Television duos
Television series by Universal Television
Television shows set in Texas
Television series by Carson Productions